there were 514 law enforcement agencies in New York State employing 66,472 Police Officers, some agencies employ Peace / Special Officers. (about 341 for each 100,000 residents) according to the US Bureau of Justice Statistics' Census of State and Local Law Enforcement Agencies.

New York State agencies 

 New York State Office of the Attorney General
 Investigations Division
 New York State Police
 New York State Park Police
 New York State Department of Corrections and Community Supervision
Office of Special Investigations
 Board of Parole
 Parole Officers
 New York Unified Court System 
 Department of Public Safety
 New York State Department of Environmental Conservation
 Division of Law Enforcement
 Division of Forest Protection
 New York State Office of Mental Health Police
 New York State Office for People With Developmental Disabilities Police
 New York State Department of Motor Vehicles
 Division of Field Investigation
 New York State Department of Taxation and Finance
 Criminal Investigations Division
 Office of Internal Affairs
 New York State Office of Children and Family Services
 Division of Juvenile Justice and Opportunities for Youth
 Bureau of Juvenile Detention Services

Bi-state agencies 
 Palisades Interstate Parkway Police Department (New York State & New Jersey)
 Port Authority of New York and New Jersey Police Department (New York State & New Jersey)
 Metropolitan Transportation Authority Police Department (New York State & Connecticut)
 Waterfront Commission of New York Harbor Police (New York State & New Jersey)

New York City Agencies
 New York City Police Department (Police Officer)
New York City Police Department School Safety Division (Special Patrolmen)
 New York City Department of Environmental Protection Police (Police Officer)
 Fire Department of the City of New York Fire Marshals (Police Officer)
 New York City Department of Correction (Correction Officers)
 New York City Department of Investigation (Special Patrolmen)
 New York City Sheriff's Office (Deputy Sheriff)
 New York City Department of Citywide Administrative Services Police (Special Officer)
 New York City Department of Health and Hospitals Police (Special Officer)
 New York City Department of Homeless Services Police (Special Officer)
 New York City Human Resources Administration Police (Special Officer)
 New York City Parks Enforcement Patrol (Special Officer)
 New York City Department of Probation (Probation Officers)
 New York City Department of Sanitation Police (Special Patrolmen)
 New York City Taxi and Limousine Commission Enforcement (Special Patrolman)
 New York City Business Integrity Commission (Special Patrolman)
 New York City Department of Health and Mental Hygiene Police (Special Officer)

County agencies 

Albany County
Albany County Sheriff's Department
Albany County District Attorney's Office
Albany County Probation Department
Allegany County
Allegany County Sheriff's Office
Allegany County District Attorney's Office
Allegany County Probation Department
Broome County
Broome County Sheriff's Office
Broome County District Attorney's Office
Broome County Probation Department
Cattaraugus County
Cattaraugus County Sheriff's Office
Cattaraugus County District Attorney's Office
Cattaraugus County Probation Department
Cayuga County
Cayuga County Sheriff's Office
Cayuga County District Attorney's Office
Cayuga County Probation Department
Chautauqua County
Chautauqua County Sheriff's Office
Chautauqua County District Attorney's Office
Chautauqua County Probation Department
Chemung County
Chemung County Sheriff's Office
Chemung County District Attorney's Office
Chemung County Probation Department
Chenango County
Chenango County Sheriff's Office
Chenango County District Attorney's Office
Chenango County Probation Department
Clinton County
Clinton County Sheriff's Department
Clinton County District Attorney's Office
Clinton County Probation Department
Columbia County
Columbia County Sheriff's Office
Columbia County District Attorney's Office
Columbia County Probation Department
Cortland County
Cortland County Sheriff's Office
Cortland County District Attorney's Office
Cortland County Probation Department
Delaware County
Delaware County Sheriff's Office
Delaware County District Attorney's Office
Delaware County Probation Department
Dutchess County
Dutchess County Sheriff's Office
Dutchess County District Attorney's Office
Dutchess County Probation Department
Erie County
Erie County, New York Sheriff's 
Erie County District Attorney's Office
Erie County Probation Department
Essex County
Essex County Sheriff's Office
Essex County District Attorney's Office
Essex County Probation Department
Franklin County
Franklin County Sheriff's Office
Franklin County District Attorney's Office
Franklin County Probation Department
Fulton County
Fulton County Sheriff's Department
Fulton County District Attorney's Office
Fulton County Probation Department
Genesee County
Genesee County Sheriff's Office
Genesee County District Attorney's Office
Genesee County Probation Department
Greene County
Greene County Sheriff's Office
Greene County District Attorney's Office
Greene County Probation Department
Hamilton County
Hamilton County Sheriff's Office
Hamilton County District Attorney's Office
Hamilton County Probation Department
Herkimer County
Herkimer County Sheriff's Office
Herkimer County District Attorney's Office
Herkimer County Probation Department
Jefferson County
Jefferson County Sheriff's Office
Jefferson County District Attorney's Office
Jefferson County Probation Department
Lewis County
Lewis County Sheriff's Office
Lewis County District Attorney's Office
Lewis County Probation Department
Livingston County
Livingston County Sheriff's Office
Livingston County District Attorney's Office
Livingston County Probation Department
Madison County
Madison County Sheriff's Office
Madison County District Attorney's Office
Madison County Probation Department
Monroe County
Monroe County Sheriff's Office
Monroe County District Attorney's Office
Monroe County Probation Department
Montgomery County
Montgomery County Sheriff's Office
Montgomery County District Attorney's Office
Montgomery County Probation Department
Nassau County
Nassau County Police Department
Nassau County Sheriff's Department
Nassau County District Attorney's Office 
Nassau County Probation Department
Niagara County
Niagara County Sheriff's Department
Niagara County District Attorney's Office
Niagara County Probation Department
Oneida County
Oneida County Sheriff's Office
Oneida County District Attorney's Office
Oneida County Probation Department
Onondaga County
Onondaga County Sheriff's Office
Onondaga County District Attorney's Office
Onondaga County Probation Department
Ontario County
Ontario County Sheriff's Office
Ontario County District Attorney's Office
Ontario County Probation Department
Orange County
Orange County Sheriff's Office
Orange County District Attorney's Office
Orange County Probation Department
Orleans County
Orleans County Sheriff's Office
Orleans County District Attorney's Office
Orleans County Probation Department
Oswego County
Oswego County Sheriff's Office
Oswego County District Attorney's Office
Oswego County Probation Department
Otsego County
Otsego County Sheriff's Office
Otsego County District Attorney's Office
Otsego County Probation Department
Putnam County
Putnam County Sheriff's Department
Putnam County District Attorney's Office
Putnam County Probation Department
Rensselaer County
Rensselaer County Sheriff's Department
Rensselaer County District Attorney's Office
Rensselaer County Probation Department
Rockland County
Rockland County Sheriff's Department
Rockland County District Attorney's Office
Rockland County Probation Department
Saratoga County
Saratoga County Sheriff's Office
Saratoga County District Attorney's Office
Saratoga County Probation Department
Schenectady County
Schenectady County Sheriff's Office
Schenectady County District Attorney's Office
Schenectady County Probation Department
Schoharie County
Schoharie County Sheriff's Office
Schoharie County District Attorney's Office
Schoharie County Probation Department
Schuyler County
Schuyler County Sheriff's Office
Schuyler County District Attorney's Office
Schuyler County Probation Department
Seneca County
Seneca County Sheriff's Office
Seneca County District Attorney's Office
Seneca County Probation Department
Steuben County
Steuben County Sheriff's Office
Steuben County District Attorney's Office
Steuben County Probation Department
St. Lawrence County
St. Lawrence County Sheriff's Office
St. Lawrence County District Attorney's Office
St. Lawrence County Probation Department
Suffolk County
Suffolk County Police Department
Suffolk County Sheriff's Office
Suffolk County District Attorney's Office
Suffolk County Probation Department
Sullivan County
Sullivan County Sheriff's Office
Sullivan County District Attorney's Office
Sullivan County Probation Department
Tioga County
Tioga County Sheriff's Office
Tioga County District Attorney's Office
Tioga County Probation Department
Tompkins County
Tompkins County Sheriff's Office
Tompkins County District Attorney's Office
Tompkins County Probation Department
Ulster County
Ulster County Sheriff's Office
Ulster County District Attorney's Office
Ulster County Probation Department
Warren County
Warren County Sheriff's Office
Warren County District Attorney's Office
Warren County Probation Department
Washington County
Washington County Sheriff's Office
Washington County District Attorney's Office
Washington County Probation Department
Wayne County
Wayne County Sheriff's Office 
Wayne County District Attorney's Office
Wayne County Probation Department
Westchester County
Westchester County Department of Public Safety
Westchester County District Attorney's Office
Westchester County Probation Department
Wyoming County
Wyoming County Sheriff's Office
Wyoming County District Attorney's Office
Wyoming County Probation Department
Yates County
Yates County Sheriff's Office
Yates County District Attorney's Office
Yates County Probation Department

New York City district attorneys 

 Bronx County
  Bronx County District Attorney's Office
 Richmond County (Staten Island)
 Richmond County District Attorney's Office
 Kings County (Brooklyn)
  Kings County District Attorney's Office
  Queens County
 Queens County District Attorney's Office
 New York County (Manhattan)
 New York County District Attorney's Office
 New York City
 Office of the Special Narcotics Prosecutor for the City of New York

Municipal agencies 
The following are municipal police departments outside of New York City. In New York, it is common for multiple municipal governments to have the same name. In these cases, the specific municipality is specified in parenthesis after the department name.

Adams Police Department (Village of Adams)
Addison Police Department (Village of Addison)
Afton Police Department (Village of Afton)
Akron Police Department
Albany Police Department (New York)|Albany Police Department
Albion Police Department (Village of Albion)
Alexandria Bay Village Police Department
Alfred Police Department (Village of Alfred)
Allegany Police Department (Village of Allegany)
Altamont Police Department
Amherst Police Department
Amityville Police Department
Amsterdam Police Department (City of Amsterdam)
Andover Police Department (Village of Andover)
Angelica Police Department (Village of Angelica)
Antwerp Police Department (Village of Antwerp)
Arcade Police Department (Village of Arcade)
Ardsley Police Department
Asharoken Police Department
Athens Police Department (Village of Athens)
Attica Police Department (Village of Attica)
Auburn Police Department
Avon Police Department (Village of Avon)
Bainbridge Police Department (Village of Bainbridge)
Baldwinsville Police Department
Ballston Spa Police Department
Barker Police Department
Batavia Police Department (City of Batavia)
Bath Police Department (Village of Bath)
Beacon Police Department
Bedford Police Department
Belmont Police Department
Bethlehem Police Department
Binghamton Police Department (City of Binghamton)
Black River Police Department
Blasdell Police Department
Blooming Grove Police Department
Bolivar Police Department (Village of Bolivar)
Bolton Police Department
Boonville Police Department (Village of Boonville)
Brant Police Department
Brewster Police Department
Briarcliff Manor Police Department
Brighton Police Department
Broadalbin Police Department (Village of Broadalbin)
Brockport Police Department
Bronxville Police Department
Brownville Police Department (Village of Brownville)
Buchanan Police Department
Buffalo Police Department
Cairo Police Department
Caledonia Police Department (Village of Caledonia)
Cambridge-Greenwich Police Department (Villages of Cambridge and Greenwich)
Camden Police Department (Village of Camden)
Camillus Police Department (Town of Camillus and Village of Camillus)
Canajoharie Police Department (Town of Canajoharie)
Canandaigua Police Department (City of Canandaigua)
Canastota Police Department
Candor Police Department
Canisteo Police Department (Village of Canisteo)
Canton Police Department
Cape Vincent Police Department (Village of Cape Vincent)
Carmel Police Department
Carroll Police Department
Carthage Police Department
Caton Town Constabulary 
Catskill Police Department (Village of Catskill)
Cattaraugus Police Department
Cayuga Heights Police Department
Cazenovia Police Department (Village of Cazenovia)
Central Square Police Department
Centre Island Police Department
Chatham Police Department (Village of Chatham)
Cheektowaga Police Department
Chester Police Department (Town of Chester)
Chester Police Department (Village of Chester)
Chittenango Police Department
Cicero Police Department
Clarkstown Police Department
Clayton Police Department (Village of Clayton)
Clifton Springs Police Department
Clyde Police Department
Cobleskill Police Department (Village of Cobleskill)
Coeymans Police Department
Cohocton Police Department (Town of Cohocton)
Cohoes Police Department
Colchester Police Department
Cold Spring Police Department
Colonie Police Department (Town of Colonie)
Cooperstown Police Department
Corfu Police Department
Corning Police Department (City of Corning)
Cornwall Police Department
Cornwall-on-Hudson Police Department
Cortland Police Department
Coxsackie Police Department (Village of Coxsackie)
Crawford Police Department
Croton-on-Hudson Police Department
Cuba Police Department (Town of Cuba)
Dansville Police Department
DeWitt Police Department
Deerpark Police Department
Delhi Police Department (Village of Delhi)
Depew Police Department
Deposit Police Department (Village of Deposit)
Dexter Police Department
Dobbs Ferry Police Department
Dolgeville Police Department
Dryden Police Department (Village of Dryden)
Dunkirk Police Department (City of Dunkirk)
Durham Police Department
East Aurora Police Department (Village of East Aurora and Town of Aurora)
East Fishkill Police Department
East Greenbush Police Department
East Hampton Police Department (Town of East Hampton)
East Hampton Police Department (Village of East Hampton)
East Rochester Police Department (Village of East Rochester)
Eastchester Police Department
Eden Police Department
Ellenville Police Department
Ellicott Police Department
Ellicottville Police Department (Town of Ellicottville)
Elmira Police Department (City of Elmira)
Elmira Police Department (Town of Elmira)
Elmira Heights Police Department
Elmsford Police Department
Endicott Police Department
Evans Police Department
Fairport Police Department
Fallsburg Police Department
Fishkill Township Police Department (Town of Fishkill)
Fishkill it was supposed to be Village Police Department (Village of Fishkill)
Floral Park Police Department
Florida Police Department
Fort Edward Police Department (Village of Fort Edward)
Fort Plain Police Department
Frankfort Police Department (Town of Frankfort)
Frankfort Police Department (Village of Frankfort)
Franklinville Police Department (Village of Franklinville)
Fredonia Police Department
Freeport Police Department
Friendship Police Department
Fulton Police Department
Garden City Police Department
Gates Police Department
Geddes Police Department
Geneseo Police Department (Village of Geneseo)
Geneva Police Department (City of Geneva) 
Glen Cove Police Department
Glen Park Police Department
Glens Falls Police Department
Glenville Police Department
Gloversville Police Department
Goshen Police Department (Town of Goshen)
Goshen Police Department (Village of Goshen)
Gouverneur Police Department (Village of Gouverneur)
Gowanda Police Department
Grand Island Police Department
Granville Police Department (Village of Granville)
Great Neck Estates Police Department
Greece Police Department
Green Island Police Department (Village of Green Island)
Greenburgh Police Department
Greene Police Department (Village of Greene)
Greenport Police Department
Greenwood Lake Police Department
Groton Police Department (Village of Groton)
Guilderland Police Department
Hamburg Police Department (Town of Hamburg)
Hamburg Police Department (Village of Hamburg)
Hamilton Police Department (Village of Hamilton)
Hammondsport Police Department
Hancock Police Department (Village of Hancock)
Harriman Police Department
Harrison Police Department (Town of Harrison)
Hastings-on-Hudson Police Department
Haverstraw Police Department (Town of Haverstraw)
Head of the Harbor Police Department
Hempstead Police Department (Village of Hempstead)
Herkimer Police Department (Village of Herkimer)
Highland Falls Police Department
Highlands Police Department
Holley Police Department
Homer Police Department (Village of Homer)
Hoosick Falls Police Department
Hornell Police Department
Horseheads Police Department (Village of Horseheads)
Hudson Police Department
Hudson Falls Police Department
Hunter Police Department (Town of Hunter)
Huntington Bay Police Department
Hyde Park Police Department
Ilion Police Department
Independence Police Department
Inlet Police Department
Interlaken Police Department
Irondequoit Police Department
Irvington Police Department
Ithaca Police Department (City of Ithaca)
Jamestown Police Department
Johnson City Police Department
Johnstown Police Department (City of Johnstown)
Jordan Police Department
Kenmore Police Department
Kensington Police Department
Kent Police Department
Kings Point Police Department
Kingston Police Department (City of Kingston)
Kirkland Police Department
Lackawanna Police Department
Lake Placid Police Department
Lake Success Police Department
Lakewood-Busti Police Department (Town of Busti and Village of Lakewood)
Lancaster Police Department (Town of Lancaster)
Larchmont Police Department
Le Roy Police Department (Village of Le Roy)
Lewisboro Police Department
Lewiston Police Department (Town of Lewiston)
Liberty Police Department (Village of Liberty)
Little Falls Police Department (City of Little Falls)
Liverpool Police Department
Lloyd Police Department
Lloyd Harbor Police Department
Lockport Police Department (City of Lockport)
Long Beach Police Department
Lowville Police Department (Village of Lowville)
Lynbrook Police Department]
Macedon Police Department
Malone Police Department (Village of Malone)
Malverne Police Department
Mamaroneck Police Department (Town of Mamaroneck)
Mamaroneck Police Department (Village of Mamaroneck)
Manchester Police Department (Village of Manchester
Manlius Police Department (Town of Manlius)
Marcellus Police Department (Village of Marcellus)
Marlborough Police Department
Massena Police Department (Village of Massena)
Maybrook Police Department
McGraw Police Department
Mechanicville Police Department
Medina Police Department
Menands Police Department
Middleport Police Department
Middletown Police Department
Millbrook Police Department
Millerton Police Department
Mohawk Police Department
Monroe Police Department (Village of Monroe)
Montgomery Police Department (Town of Montgomery)
Montgomery Police Department (Village of Montgomery)
Monticello Police Department
Moravia Police Department (Village of Moravia)
Moriah Police Department
Mount Hope Police Department
Mount Morris Police Department (Village of Mount Morris)
Mount Pleasant Police Department
Mount Vernon Police Department
Muttontown Police Department
Nassau Police Department (Village of Nassau)
New Berlin Police Department (Town of New Berlin)
New Castle Police Department
New Hartford Police Department (Town of New Hartford)
New Paltz Police Department (Town of New Platz and Village of New Paltz)
New Rochelle Police Department
New Windsor Police Department
New York Mills Police Department
Newark Police Department 
Newburgh Police Department (City of Newburgh)
Newburgh Police Department (Town of Newburgh)
Niagara Police Department 
Niagara Falls Police Department
Niskayuna Police Department
Nissequogue Police Department
Norfolk Police Department
North Castle Police Department
North Greenbush Police Department
North Hornell Police Department
North Salem Police Department
North Syracuse Police Department
North Tonawanda Police Department
Northport Police Department
Northville Police Department
Norwich Police Department (City of Norwich)
Norwood Police Department
Nunda Police Department (Town of Nunda and Village of Nunda)
Ocean Beach Police Department
Ogden Police Department
Ogdensburg Police Department
Old Brookville Police Department
Old Westbury Police Department
Olean Police Department (City of Olean)
Olive Police Department
Oneida Police Department
Oneonta Police Department (City of Oneonta)
Orangetown Police Department
Orchard Park Police Department (Town of Orchard Park)
Oriskany Police Department
Ossining Police Department (Town of Ossining)
Ossining Police Department (Village of Ossining)
Oswego Police Department (City of Oswego)
Owego Police Department (Village of Owego)
Oxford Police Department
Oyster Bay Cove Police Department
Painted Post Police Department
Palmyra Police Department (Village of Palmyra)
Peekskill Police Department
Pelham Police Department (Village of Pelham)
Pelham Manor Police Department
Penn Yan Police Department
Perry Police Department (Village of Perry)
Phelps Police Department (Village of Phelps)
Philadelphia Police Department (Village of Philadelphia)
Philmont Police Department
Phoenix Police Department
Piermont Police Department
Pine Plains Police Department
Plattekill Police Department
Plattsburgh Police Department (City of Plattsburgh)
Pleasantville Police Department
Port Byron Police Department
Port Chester Police Department
Port Dickinson Police Department
Port Jervis Police Department
Port Washington Police District (Villages of Port Washington North and Baxter Estates) 
Portville Police Department (Village of Portville)
Potsdam Police Department (Village of Potsdam)
Poughkeepsie Police Department (City of Poughkeepsie)
Poughkeepsie Township Police Department (Town of Poughkeepsie)
Pound Ridge Police Department
Pulaski Police Department
Quogue Police Department
Ramapo Police Department
Red Hook Police Department (Village of Red Hook)
Rensselaer Police Department
Rhinebeck Police Department (Village of Rhinebeck)
Riverhead Police Department
Rochester Police Department
Rockville Centre Police Department
Rome Police Department
Rosendale Police Department
Rotterdam Police Department
Rye Police Department (City of Rye)
Rye Brook Police Department
Sacketts Harbor Police Department
Sag Harbor Police Department
Salamanaca Police Department (City of Salamanaca)
Sands Point Police Department
Saranac Lake Police Department
Saratoga Springs Police Department
Saugerties Police Department (Town of Saugerties)
Scarsdale Police Department (Village of Scarsdale)
Schenectady Police Department
Schodack Police Department
Schoharie Police Department (Village of Schoharie)
Scotia Police Department
Seneca Falls Police Department
Shandaken Police Department
Shawangunk Police Department
Shelter Island Police Department
Sherburne Police Department (Village of Sherburne)
Sherrill Police Department
Sidney Police Department (Village of Sidney)
Silver Creek Police Department
Skaneateles Police Department (Village of Skaneateles)
Sleepy Hollow Police Department
Sodus Police Department (Village of Sodus)
Sodus Point Police Department
Solvay Police Department
Somers Police Department
South Glens Falls Police Department
South Nyack-Grand View Police Department (Villages of South Nyack and Grand View-on-Hudson)
Southampton Police Department (Town of Southampton)
Southampton Police Department (Village of Southampton)
Southold Police Department
Southport Police Department
Spencer Police Department (Village of Spencer)
Spring Valley Police Department
St. Johnsville Police Department (Village of St. Johnsville)
Stillwater Police Department (Town of Stillwater)
Stockport Police Department
Stony Point Police Department
Suffern Police Department
Syracuse Police Department
Tarrytown Police Department
Theresa Police Department (Village of Theresa)
Ticonderoga Police Department
Tonawanda Police Department (City of Tonawanda)
Tonawanda Police Department (Town of Tonawanda)
Troy Police Department
Trumansburg Police Department
Tuckahoe Police Department
Tupper Lake Police Department (Village of Tupper Lake)
Tuxedo Police
Tuxedo Park Police Department
Ulster Police Department
Utica Police Department
Vernon Police Department (Village of Vernon)
Vestal Police Department
Walden Police Department
Wallkill Police Department
Walton Police Department (Village of Walton)
Wappingers Falls Police Department
Warsaw Police Department (Village of Warsaw)
Warwick Police Department (Town of Warwick)
Washingtonville Police Department
Waterford Police Department (Town of Waterford and Village of Waterford)
Waterloo Police Department (Village of Waterloo)
Watertown Police Department (City of Watertown)
Watervliet Police Department
Watkins Glen Police Department
Waverly Police Department
Wayland Police Department (Village of Wayland)
Webb Police Department
Webster Police Department (Town of Webster)
Weedsport Police Department
Wellsville Police Department (Village of Wellsville)
West Carthage Police Department
West Seneca Police Department
Westfield Police Department
Westhampton Beach Police Department
Willing Police Department
Windham Police Department
White Plains Police Department
Whitehall Police Department (Village of Whitehall)
Whitesboro Police Department
Whitestown Police Department
Windham Police Department
Wolcott Police Department (Village of Wolcott)
Woodbury Police Department (Town of Woodbury)
Woodridge Police Department
Woodstock Police Department
Yonkers Police Department
Yorktown Police Department
Yorkville Police Department
Youngstown Police Department

College and university agencies 

Public colleges and universities
 New York State University Police
 * City University of New York Public Safety Department
 * Cayuga Community College Office of Public Safety
 * Erie Community College Office of College Safety
 Finger Lakes Community College Campus Police Department 
 * Fulton-Montgomery Community College Department of Public Safety
 * Genesee Community College Office of Campus Safety
 * Herkimer College Department of Campus Safety
 * Hudson Valley Community College Department of Public Safety
 * Monroe Community College Department of Public Safety
 * Mohawk Valley Community College Department of Public Safety
 * Onondaga Community College Department of Campus Safety and Security
 * SUNY Adirondack Office of Public Safety
 * SUNY Broome Community College Office of Public Safety
 * SUNY Corning Community College Department of Public Safety
 * SUNY Ulster Office of Public Safety & Security
 Tompkins Cortland Community College Campus Police Department
Private colleges and universities
 * Canisius College Department of Public Safety
 Cornell University Police Department
 * Hamilton College Department of Campus Safety
 * Ithaca College Office of Public Safety and Emergency Management
 *Rensselaer Polytechnic Institute Department of Public Safety
 * Syracuse University Department of Public Safety
 * Union College Department of Campus Safety
 * University of Rochester Department of Public Safety
Agencies marked with a "∗" possess limited powers on their campuses under NYS Education Law, Article 129-A,§6435

Federal agencies 

 Amtrak Police Department
 Bureau of Alcohol, Tobacco, Firearms and Explosives
 Bureau of Indian Affairs Police
 Department of the Navy Police
 Department of the Air Force Police
 Diplomatic Security Service
 Drug Enforcement Administration
 Federal Air Marshal Service
 Federal Bureau of Investigation
 FBI Police
 Federal Bureau of Prisons
 U.S. Probation and Pretrial Services System
 Federal Protective Service
 Federal Reserve Police
 Homeland Security Investigations (HSI)
 IRS Criminal Investigation Division
 National Park Service Law Enforcement Rangers
 Naval Criminal Investigative Service
 U.S. Army Criminal Investigation Command
 U.S. Customs and Border Protection (Border Patrol and Office of Field Ops)
 United States Fish and Wildlife Service Office of Law Enforcement
 United States Forest Service (Law Enforcement and Investigations)
 United States Marshals Service
 United States Mint Police
 United States Park Police
 United States Postal Inspection Service
 United States Secret Service
 United States Department of Veterans Affairs Police
 Transportation Security Administration
 United States Environmental Protection Agency Criminal Investigation Division

Native American agencies
 Cayuga Nation Police Department
 Oneida Indian Nation Police Department
 St. Regis Mohawk Tribal Police Department
 Seneca Nation Marshal's Office
 Seneca Nation of Indians Fish and Wildlife Department

Other government-run agencies 
Includes agencies run by NYS Public-benefit corporations
 Brooklyn Public Library Department of Public Safety 
 Broome County Government Security Division
 Erie County Medical Center Hospital Public Safety
 Lake George Park Commission Marine Patrol
 New York Racing Association Peace Officers
 New York State Bridge Authority Police
 Niagara Frontier Transportation Authority Police Department
 Roswell Park Comprehensive Cancer Center Public Safety
 MTA Bridge and Tunnels.
Troy Housing Authority Department of Public Safety

Private agencies 
 Bay Terrace Public Safety Department
 Big Six Towers Public Safety Department
 Boston and Maine Railroad Police Department
 Canadian National Police Service
 Canadian Pacific Police Service
 Co-op City Department of Public Safety
 Columbia-Greene Humane Society/SPCA Law Enforcement
 CSX Police Department
 Dutchess County SPCA Humane Law Enforcement
 Hudson Valley SPCA Humane Law Enforcement
 Humane Society of Greater Rochester Humane Law Enforcement
 Hunts Point Department of Public Safety
 Kaleida Health Security Department (Peace Officers) (Erie County)
 Morningside Heights Housing Corporation Department of Public Safety
 Norfolk Southern Railway Police Department
Parkchester Department of Public Safety
 Peter Cooper Village-Stuyvesant Town Department of Public Safety
 Putnam County SPCA
 Roosevelt Island Public Safety Department
 Sea Gate Public Safety department
 SPCA of Westchester County Humane Law Enforcement Unit
 SPCA Serving Erie County Investigations and Rescue Department
 Spring Creek Towers Department of Public Safety
 Suffolk County SPCA Humane Law Enforcement
 Ulster County SPCA Humane Law Enforcement
 Yonkers Raceway Police

Disbanded agencies 

 Babylon Town Police Department
 Babylon Village Police Department
 Brightwaters Police Department
 Bronx County Sheriff's Office
 Brookhaven Town Police Department
 Brooklyn Police Department
 Brooklyn Bridge Police
 Brooklyn Town Police Department
 Bushwick Town Police Department
 Buffalo Municipal Housing Authority Police (merged with Buffalo City Police Department in 2010)
 Busti Police Department
 Town of Clay Police Department
 Town of Cortlandt Police Department (New York)
 East Syracuse Village Police
 Town of Esopus Police Department
 Flatbush Town Police Department
 Flatlands Town Police Department
 Flushing Town Police Department
 Gravesend Town Police Department
 Greenport Police Department
 Hampton Bays Police Department
 Village of Hermon Police Department
 Huntington Town Police Department
 Islip Town Police Department
 Jamaica Town Police Department
 Kingsbridge Town Police Department
 Kings County Sheriff's Office
 Lakewood Police Department
 Lindenhurst Police Department
 Long Island City Police Department
 Long Island Rail Road Police Department (merged to form the Metropolitan Transportation Authority Police Department)
 Long Island State Parkway Police (merged with the New York State Police and New York State Park Police)
 Lyons Village Police Department
 Metro-North Railroad Police Department (merged to form the Metropolitan Transportation Authority Police Department)
 Morrisania Town Police Department
 Mount Kisco Police Department
 Naples Village Police Department (technically the Village still has a police department with a station but currently has no officers) 
 New Lots Town Police Department
 Newtown Town Police Department
 New Utrecht Town Police Department
 New York City Housing Authority Police Department (merged with the New York City Police Department)
 New York City Board of Education Division of School Safety (merged with the New York City Police Department)
 New York City Transit Authority Police Department (merged with the New York City Police Department)
 New York City Telegraph Bureau
 New York City Bureau of Water Supply Police
 New York County Sheriff's Office
 New York Cross Harbor Railroad Police
 New York State Capital Police (merged with the New York State Police)
 New York State Division of Parole (merged to form the New York State Department of Corrections and Community Supervision)
 Town of Ossining Police Department (New York)
 Town of Parish Police Department
 Patchogue Village Police Department
 Town of Putnam Valley New York Police Department (Putnam County)
 Queens County Sheriff's Office
 Richmond County Sheriff's Office
 Staten Island Rapid Transit Police Department (merged with the Metropolitan Transportation Authority Police Department)
 Smithtown Town Police Department
 Suffolk County Park Police (merged with the Suffolk County Police Department)
 Westchester County Sheriff's Department
 Westchester County Parkway Police
 West Farms Town Police Department
 ASPCA Humane Law Enforcement Division
 Bronx County Safety Patrol
 New York State SPCC Child Abuse Unit

See also
 Crime in New York
 Law enforcement in the United States
 Briana's Law

References

Sources
Directory of New York State Criminal Justice Agencies, New York State Division of Criminal Justice Services

New York
Law enforcement agencies of New York (state)
Law enforcement agencies